Pramod shetty an Indian actor known for his work in Kannada cinema. Pramod started his carrier as a theater artist. He also appread in several kannada serial. Pramod made his film debut in 2010 with film Jugaari. He got recognition for his roles in Ulidavaru Kandanthe (2014) and Kirik Party (2016).

Personal life 
Pramod Shetty is married to Supreetha Shetty, an actress, since 2010 and they have two children.

Filmography

As an actor

Awards 
 South Indian International Movie Awards 2017 – Nominated for Best Comedian for Kirik Party.
 South Indian International Movie Awards 2021  - Nominated for Best Supporting Role Avane Srimannarayana. 
 South Indian International Movie Awards 2021 – Nominated for Best Actor in a Debut Role Ondu Shikariya Kathe.
 South Indian International Movie Awards 2022 - Best Actor in a Negative Role for Movie Hero (2021 film)
  Chittara Star Award 2022  - Outstanding Achievement In Kannada Film Industry Chittara.
  Chanakya Award - 2022 - Communicator Of The Year - Films

References

External links
 

Male actors from Karnataka
Indian male film actors
Living people
Male actors in Kannada cinema
21st-century Indian male actors
1983 births